Howard David Krein (born 1966/1967) is an American otolaryngologist, plastic surgeon, and business executive. He is the husband of Ashley Biden, the daughter of United States President Joe Biden. He is an assistant professor of otolaryngology at Thomas Jefferson University and is a founding partner and co-director of Thomas Jefferson University Hospital's Facial Aesthetic and Reconstructive Center. Krein is the chief medical officer at StartUp Health, a venture capital and health technology firm. He served on the Biden Cancer Initiative's board of directors from 2017 to 2019. Krein has advised the Joe Biden 2020 presidential campaign on its COVID-19 pandemic response in an unofficial role.

Early life and education 
Krein was born and raised in Cherry Hill, New Jersey. He is the son of Stanley Krein, an insurance executive and former director of marketing at Aetna, and Brenda Ferne "Bunny" Lipner Krein, a physician assistant in cardiology at Cooper University Hospital. His family is Jewish.

As a teenager Krein competed in CowTown, a weekly summertime rodeo competition in Pennsgrove, New Jersey. He became a volunteer fire fighter at the age of sixteen.

Krein graduated from Rutgers University with a bachelor's degree in biology and a master's degree in neuroscience. He obtained a doctoral degree in cell and development biology from the University of Medicine and Dentistry of New Jersey's Robert Wood Johnson Medical School in 1996. He graduated from medical school at Thomas Jefferson University in 2000. He completed an internship in emergency medicine and general surgery and a residency in otolaryngology at Jefferson. He completed a fellowship in facial plastic and reconstructive surgery at the Medical College of Virginia.

Career 

Krein is a board-certified otolaryngologist who also specializes in facial and reconstructive surgery. He has volunteered at the International Hospital for Children, operating on children with facial deformities in Belize. Krein also volunteers with Faces of Honor, where he performs reconstructive surgery for victims of domestic violence and veterans  of the War in Afghanistan and the Iraqi conflict.

Krein has been an assistant professor of otolaryngology at Thomas Jefferson University since 2007,  and has served as the Senior Director of Health Policy and Innovation at the Sidney Kimmel Cancer Center since 2016. He is a founding partner and co-director of the hospital's Herbert Kean Center for Facial Aesthetics.

Since 2011 Krein has served as a Chief Medical Officer at StartUp Health, previously Organized Wisdom, a venture capital and health technology firm. The firm, whose chief executive officer is Krein's brother, lobbied the government on health industry technology regulations in 2018.
 
Krein has been an advisor to the Joe Biden 2020 presidential campaign on its COVID-19 pandemic response. StartUp Health has been running an initiative to invest in health care startups offering solutions to the global pandemic since March 2020. Krein's role with the Biden campaign while working as an executive of a health technology firm has led to speculation about a conflict of interest. StartUp Health described Krein as an advisor to the Obama administration in 2011. Krein has stated that he does not have a formal role in the Biden campaign, but has participated in briefings on the coronavirus based on his experience treating patients and coordinating Thomas Jefferson University Hospital's response to the outbreak.

Personal life 
Krein began dating Ashley Biden, a social worker and daughter of U.S. President Joe Biden and First Lady Jill Biden, in 2010 after being introduced by her half-brother, Beau Biden. They married in a Catholic-Jewish interfaith ceremony at St. Joseph's on the Brandywine in Greenville, Delaware, led by a Catholic priest assisted by a rabbi.

References

External links
 

American chief operating officers
American otolaryngologists
Jewish otolaryngologists
American plastic surgeons
Biden family
Joe Biden 2020 presidential campaign
Living people
People from Cherry Hill, New Jersey
Year of birth missing (living people)
21st-century American physicians
21st-century American businesspeople
Physicians from New Jersey
1960s births